Mis-Teeq were a British girl group, consisting of Alesha Dixon, Su-Elise Nash and Sabrina Washington. They had two top-ten albums and seven consecutive top-ten singles, with chart-topping success on the UK Singles Chart as well as across Europe, Asia, Australasia and the US. The group had originally been a quartet with Zena McNally who left in January 2001.

The second line-up released their debut studio album Lickin' on Both Sides on 27 October 2001, which peaked at number three on the UK Albums Chart and was certified double platinum.  

The album featured the group's first five singles, all of which became UK Top 10 hits, including their debut single "Why?" with McNally and "All I Want".  On 29 March 2003, following a hiatus, they released their second studio album Eye Candy, also a double platinum success.  This album featured their biggest international hit "Scandalous", which peaked at No.2 on the United States Billboard Dance charts. The group announced in February 2005 that they would be splitting to pursue solo careers, owing to the demise of their record label Telstar Records. They released a greatest hits album on 25 April 2005 to coincide with their separation.

History

1997–2001: Formation and line-up changes
Alesha Dixon and Sabrina Washington met in 1997 at Dance Attic studios in Fulham through Louise Porter, who was putting together a group for her production company Big Out Ltd. The two worked with Louise Porter for a couple of years before being joined by Tina Barrett to form a trio performing singing and dancing. They were named Face2Face, were unsigned, and all band members still worked day jobs. Barrett left to join S Club 7 after a successful audition for Simon Fuller and was replaced by Zena McNally and Su-Elise Nash. Their then producer David Brant (writer of their first two hit singles, "Why?" and "All I Want") introduced them via DJ Darren Stokes (TinTinOut) to Inferno Records (sub pop) A&R man Pat Travers, who went on to sign them to Telstar Records and changed their name to Mis-Teeq. After months of recording—including sessions with producers Norwegian duo Stargate along with Brant (Vybrant Music), Ed Case, Blacksmith, Rishi Rich, and Ceri Evans—Mis-Teeq released their debut single in 2001, "Why?", a Latin-flavoured mid-tempo song co-written and produced by Brant. A garage remix by Matt "Jam" Lamont soon became a success in the underground UK garage scene, and as a result a second music video for the song was filmed and released. "Why" became a hit on the UK Singles Chart with a peak position of number eight. McNally decided to leave the line-up in January 2001 saying she felt unhappy about "an unbalance in the group".

2001–2002: Lickin' on Both Sides, touring and hiatus
The three remaining members went on to release their second single "All I Want" in June 2001. It was co-written and originally produced by David Brant, and produced and remixed by Ceri Evans (also known as Sunship). The song topped the success of the trio's debut single, becoming a number 2 hit in the UK and simultaneously entering the top 30 of the Australian singles chart. The group finally released their debut album Lickin' on Both Sides on 27 October 2001. It was certified Platinum by the British Phonographic Industry on 7 September, 2001.

Nevertheless, Mis-Teeq saw instant international success with their Stargate-produced third single "One Night Stand". While the song peaked at number 5 on the UK singles chart, it also entered the top 20 in Australia, New Zealand, Norway, and Denmark. In 2002, the band's fourth single, "B with Me", continued the group's remarkable sales with another top 10 entry in the UK; once again entering at number 5. The last release from Lickin' on Both Sides was a double A-side of "Roll on" and the Montell Jordan cover "This Is How We Do It", latter song being featured on the soundtrack for Ali G's 2002 film Ali G Indahouse. This release entered the charts at number 7 on 29 June 2002. The band supported Shaggy on his UK tour in 2002.

2003–2005: Eye Candy, international breakthrough and split
Returning from a short hiatus, Mis-Teeq released their second album, Eye Candy on 29 March 2003. The album featured production by Stargate, Ed Case, Salaam Remi, singer Joe, Delroy "D-Roy" Andrews and Jermaine Dupri and debuted at its peak position of number 6 on the UK Albums Chart While Eye Candy'''s sales failed to link on the sudden success of Lickin' on Both Sides, pre-released lead single "Scandalous" became the group's most successful single by then: It reached number 2 in the UK and top 10 in Ireland, New Zealand, Australia, and Denmark.

In June 2003, the album's second single "Can't Get It Back" became the band's seventh and final domestic top ten single. Originally a remake of the same-titled unreleased Blaque single from 2002, Mis-Teeq and Telstar agreed not to use album version, instead releasing the alternate "Ignorants Radio Edit" as an official single version which entered the UK charts at number 8 on 12 July 2003. The song also was included on a Special Edition of Eye Candy which was released in December of the same year and spawned a third single with "Style". The song peaked at number 13.

"Scandalous" was released in the US in May 2004 (under another label, Reprise Records) and reached number 35 on the Billboard Hot 100 chart in June, making it their only single to chart in the US. The song was featured as the theme of the film Catwoman, starring Halle Berry, in Summer 2004.

Also in 2004, Mis-Teeq began touring the US. After appearing on television shows such as Jimmy Kimmel, Pepsi smash and Carson Daly, the girls had built up their fan base. Unfortunately in 2005, the demise of their record label Telstar left Mis-Teeq in a situation where they were unsure of where to go or what to do next. Following the major release of their third album Mis-Teeq and the single "Scandalous" in 2004, the band's record label Telstar Records went bankrupt.

After the announcement of their split in 2005, they released a compilation album, Greatest Hits, containing a new track, a cover of the Andrews Sisters 1940s song "Shoo Shoo Baby", and they were awarded a 2005 Soul Train Lady of Soul Nomination for Best R&B/Soul Album - Group, Band or Duo for their album Mis-Teeq.

On 9 February 2011, it was reported that the group were in talks to reform for a comeback tour but this was denied by Dixon. Two years later, Dixon said that she would never rule out a reunion. In September 2014, Su-Elise stated in an interview with Fashion Plus Magazine that the group were in talks and were working on a reunion album.

Members

 Alesha Dixon (2001–2005)
 Sabrina Washington (2001–2005)
 Su-Elise Nash (2001–2005)
 Zena McNally (2001)

Discography

Studio albumsLickin' on Both Sides (2001)Eye Candy (2003)

Compilation albumsMis-Teeq (2004)
 Mis-Teeq: Greatest Hits'' (2005)

References

External links
Mis-Teeq Myspace
Interview with Alesha in 2006 on I Like Music

Musical groups established in 1999
Musical groups disestablished in 2005
English dance girl groups
British contemporary R&B musical groups
UK garage groups
English dance music groups
Black British musical groups
Musical quartets
British musical trios
Musical groups from London
Telstar Records artists
Warner Records artists
Reprise Records artists
1999 establishments in England
Women hip hop groups
British hip hop girl groups
British R&B girl groups